

Women's

Finals round

Ringette
Ringette competitions
2007 Canada Winter Games